The 1903 Tampa football team was an amateur American football team based in Tampa, Florida which competed during the 1903 college football season. The Tampa Football club should not be confused with the University of Tampa's football program, as the school was not established until 1933.

The Tampa team was active for several years in the early 1900s and competed against early college football squads along with amateur teams organized by military bases and other local clubs from around Florida. The club's founder and manager, local businessman J. L. Reed, was considered instrumental in bringing the game of football to Tampa.

The 1903 Tampa Football club team was coached by Bobby Lynch and posted a 3–2–1 record. The squad's colors were red and black.

The touchdown in the New Years Day game was scored by Bob Jaughin, future sheriff of Hillsborough County, Florida, during Prohibition.

Schedule

References

Tampa
Tampa football